Pterostylis cobarensis, commonly known as the inland rustyhood or Cobar rustyhood is a plant in the orchid family Orchidaceae and is endemic to Australia. It has a rosette of leaves and between two and ten hairy, green and brown  flowers with translucent white "windows" and a fleshy, insect-like labellum. It grows in inland areas of eastern Australia.

Description
Pterostylis cobarensis, is a terrestrial,  perennial, deciduous, herb with an underground tuber. Three to five stem leaves are wrapped around the flowering spike. Flowering occurs from September to October.

Taxonomy and naming
Pterostylis cobarensis was first formally described in 1989 by Mark Clements from a specimen collected near Cobar and the description was published in Australian Orchid Research. The specific epithet (cobarensis) alludes to the location of the type specimen.

Distribution and habitat
The inland rustyhood occurs mainly in New South Wales between Broken Hill, Nyngan and Young, growing in rocky places and in mallee, usually where runoff occurs. It also occurs in border regions in South Australia and on the Darling Downs in Queensland.

Conservation
Pterostylis cobarensis is classified as vulnerable in New South Wales.

References

cobarensis
Endemic orchids of Australia
Orchids of New South Wales
Orchids of Queensland
Orchids of South Australia
Plants described in 1989